The 2010–11 Richmond Spiders men's basketball team represented the University of Richmond in National Collegiate Athletic Association (NCAA) Division I college basketball during the 2010–11 season. Richmond competed as a member of the Atlantic 10 Conference (A-10) under sixth-year head basketball coach Chris Mooney and played its home games at the Robins Center.

After finishing in third place in the Atlantic 10 during the regular season, Richmond defeated the University of Dayton to win the 2011 Atlantic 10 men's basketball tournament.  With the championship, Richmond was awarded an automatic bid to the 2011 NCAA Division I men's basketball tournament, where it received a 12-seed  and defeated Vanderbilt in the second round of the tournament before eliminating Morehead State in the third round.  The Spiders fell in the Sweet Sixteen to Kansas.

Preseason
Point guard and reigning Atlantic 10 Player of the Year Kevin Anderson was named to the preseason watchlist for the John R. Wooden Award.

Recruiting

Roster

Schedule

|-
!colspan=9| Regular Season

|-
!colspan=9| 2011 Atlantic 10 men's basketball tournament

|-
!colspan=9| 2011 NCAA Division I men's basketball tournament

References

Richmond Spiders men's basketball seasons
Richmond
Richmond
Richmond men's basketball
Richmond men's basketball